EasyChair is a web-based conference management software system. It has been used since 2002 in the scientific community for tasks such as organising research paper submission and review. In 2012, EasyChair began offering an open access online publication service for conference proceedings.

Description 
EasyChair is a paid web-based conference management software system used, among other tasks, to organise paper submission and review, similar to other event management system software such as OpenConf. EasyChair is hosted by the Department of Computer Science at the University of Manchester. It is owned by an English company.

The EasyChair website also provides an open access online publication service for conference proceedings. When launched in 2012, the service was for computer science only, but in 2016 it was expanded to all sciences.

History 
The EasyChair software has been in continuous development since 2002. , the code base consist of nearly 300,000 lines of code, and it has been used by more than 41,000 conferences. EasyChair has been widely used since 2002 in the scientific community, with more than two and a half million users reported in 2019.

See also 
 Abstract management
 Academic conference

References

External links 
 

Academic conferences
Web applications
Department of Computer Science, University of Manchester
Abstract management software